The 1981 All-Ireland Senior Football Championship Final was the 94th All-Ireland Final and the deciding match of the 1981 All-Ireland Senior Football Championship, an inter-county Gaelic football tournament for the top teams in Ireland.

Kerry completed a four-in-a-row with a brilliant Jack O'Shea goal.

It was the second of five All-Ireland football titles won by Kerry in the 1980s.

References

All-Ireland Senior Football Championship Final
All-Ireland Senior Football Championship Final, 1981
All-Ireland Senior Football Championship Finals
All-Ireland Senior Football Championship Finals
Kerry county football team matches
Offaly county football team matches